"I'm Putting All My Eggs in One Basket" is a popular song written by Irving Berlin for the 1936 film Follow the Fleet, where it was introduced by Fred Astaire and Ginger Rogers. Astaire had a huge hit with the song in 1936 and other popular versions that year were by Jan Garber (vocal by Fritz Heilbron) and by Guy Lombardo (vocal by Carmen Lombardo).

Other notable recordings
Boswell Sisters - recorded for Decca Records (catalog No.709A) on February 12, 1936.
Louis Armstrong - recorded for Decca Records (catalog No.698A) on February 4, 1936.
Zarah Leander - Swedish version titled "Du ä' så väldigt lik en ja' känner" (1936)
Bing Crosby - recorded the song for his film Blue Skies in 1945 but it was cut from the film.
Bob Wills and His Texas Playboys - Tiffany Transcriptions Vol. 6 (1945)
Fred Astaire - for his album The Astaire Story (1953)
Carmen McRae - Blue Moon (1956) 
Ella Fitzgerald - Ella Fitzgerald Sings the Irving Berlin Songbook (1958)
Ella Fitzgerald and Louis Armstrong - Ella and Louis Again (1957)
Diane Schuur and B.B. King - Heart To Heart (1994)
Stacey Kent - Let Yourself Go: Celebrating Fred Astaire (2000)
Velody - "Faces" (2015)

References

Songs written by Irving Berlin
Fred Astaire songs
Ella Fitzgerald songs
1936 songs
Carmen McRae songs
1936 singles